The South West Cape is a cape located at the south-west corner of Tasmania, Australia.

The cape is bound to the southeast and southwest by the Southern Ocean and is located south of Low Rocky Point and Point Hibbs.

The South West Cape Range provides a buffer between the cape and the inland wilderness area to the east and north, and the next range to the east is the Melaleuca Range.
The high point of the southern end of the range, closest to the cape is Mount Karamu at 439 m.  The mount is named after the USS steam ship which foundered off the cape in 1925.

See also

 South East Cape
 South Coast Track

References

South West Tasmania
Headlands of Tasmania
South coast of Tasmania